

Pterosaurs

New taxa

Paleontologists
 Birth of the Reverend William Fox, a significant early collector of dinosaur fossils from the Isle of Wight.

References

1810s in paleontology
Paleontology